Chastel-sur-Murat (literally Chastel on Murat; Auvergnat: Chastèl sobre Murat) is a former commune in the Cantal department in south-central France. On 1 January 2017, it was merged into the commune Murat.

Population

See also
Communes of the Cantal department

References

Former communes of Cantal
Populated places disestablished in 2017